August "Gustl" Auinger (born 3 May 1955 in Lambach) is a former Grand Prix motorcycle road racer from Austria. His best year was in 1985 when he finished in third place in the 125cc world championship, winning three Grand Prix races in the process. Auinger won a total of five Grand Prix races during his career.

He is now a riders' coach for the Red Bull MotoGP Rookie Cup.

References 

1955 births
Living people
125cc World Championship riders
250cc World Championship riders
Austrian motorcycle racers